The 1998 Sutton Council election took place on 7 May 1998 to elect members of Sutton London Borough Council in London, England. The whole council was up for election and the Liberal Democrats stayed in overall control of the council.

Background

Election result

Ward results

WARDS BELOW STILL TO BE UPDATED

References

1998
1998 London Borough council elections